Anne-Marie Rose Nicholson (born 7 April 1991) is an English singer. She has attained charting singles on the UK Singles Chart, including Clean Bandit's "Rockabye", which peaked at number one, as well as "Alarm", "Ciao Adios", "Friends", "2002", "Don't Play" and "Kiss My (Uh-Oh)". Her debut studio album, Speak Your Mind, was released in 2018 and peaked at number three on the UK Albums Chart. 

Anne-Marie was nominated for four awards at the 2019 Brit Awards, including Best British Female Solo Artist. To date she has been nominated for ten Brit Awards and has also received a nomination for a Billboard Music Award. In 2015, she signed a record deal with Asylum (a sub-label of Atlantic Records) and began releasing her work through the label. In 2021, she released her second studio album, Therapy, and began appearing as a coach on the television singing competition The Voice UK.

Early life
Anne-Marie was born 7 April 1991 and raised in East Tilbury in Essex. Her father, a builder and handyman, is from the East End of London, while her mother, a teacher, is from Essex. She has one sister, Samantha. She appeared in two West End productions as a child—Les Misérables when she was six, and Whistle Down the Wind, alongside Jessie J, when she was 12.

Anne-Marie is a black belt in Shotokan karate, having started taking karate lessons aged nine. She won Double Gold in the 2002 Funakoshi Shotokan Karate Association World Championships, Gold and Silver in the 2007 Funakoshi Shotokan Karate Association World Championships, and Gold in the United Kingdom Traditional Karate Federation National Championships. She credits this with teaching her "discipline and focus – basically everything I need for this career" but now does not have time to practise it frequently, due to her performing commitments. She attended Palmer's College in Thurrock as a teenager. Anne-Marie has admitted that at school she was a nightmare, and that she feels bad for the teachers because she made their lives hell.

Career

2013–2015: Career beginnings and Karate

Anne-Marie cut a solo demo for Rocket Records in 2013 called "Summer Girl". Her solo career was curtailed for her to develop herself as an artist; in the interim, she guested on tracks by Magnetic Man, Gorgon City and Raized by Wolves, after which she caught the attention of Rudimental; one of their vocalists left, and so they asked Anne-Marie to replace her. She featured on four tracks on their album We the Generation, of which two were co-features with Dizzee Rascal and Will Heard; the latter, "Rumour Mill", reached number 67 on the UK Singles Chart. She spent two years touring alongside them. On 10 June 2015, Anne-Marie released her debut EP Karate, which went out on the new label Major Tom's; two singles were released from it, "Karate" and "Gemini", which led to Anne-Marie making her first solo live performances. That November she released "Do It Right", which peaked at number 90 on the UK Singles Chart. It was originally intended to appear on Anne-Marie's debut full-length album, which at the time, had the working title of Breathing Fire.

2016–2018: Speak Your Mind
On 20 May 2016, Anne-Marie released "Alarm", the first single from her debut album. It spent one week at number 76 in June before resurfacing a month later; it later peaked at number 2 and was certified Platinum in the UK. In October 2016, Anne-Marie was confirmed to play at the thirty-first edition of Eurosonic Noorderslag in Groningen, Netherlands. The same month, Clean Bandit released their song "Rockabye", with Anne-Marie as main vocalist and featuring Jamaican rapper Sean Paul. It spent nine consecutive weeks at number one and gained the coveted Christmas number one. The song has since been certified multi-platinum across most of Europe, North America and Oceania.

On 10 March 2017, Anne-Marie released "Ciao Adios", which she had previously performed live at KOKO on 28 November 2016. The single became a top 10 hit in the UK, charting at number nine and being certified Platinum by the BPI. Anne-Marie's next single saw her collaborate with Snakehips on "Either Way", which also featured Joey Badass. On 21 September Anne-Marie released "Heavy", followed by "Then" on 15 December. In 2018, Anne-Marie collaborated with Marshmello on "Friends". The song was released on 9 February 2018, and was Anne-Marie's second top five UK hit as a lead artist. On 22 February, Anne-Marie announced that her debut studio album, Speak Your Mind, would be released on 27 April 2018. Prior to the release of her album, Anne-Marie released the single "2002" on 20 April in response to constant urging by Ed Sheeran, the co-creator of the song. In July 2018, Anne-Marie featured on a David Guetta song titled "Don't Leave Me Alone", which peaked at 18 on the UK Singles chart.

In November 2018, Anne-Marie and James Arthur recorded "Rewrite the Stars" from The Greatest Showman for the re-recording of its soundtrack, The Greatest Showman: Reimagined.

2019–2021: The Voice UK, single releases and Therapy
In 2019, Anne-Marie featured on the single "Lonely" by American singer Lauv for the soundtrack of 13 Reasons Why: Season 3. The single was released on 1 August 2019. Anne-Marie released the song "Birthday" on 7 February 2020. On Mother's Day 2020, Anne-Marie released the song "Her". "To Be Young", was released on 17 July 2020, featuring American rapper Doja Cat.

On 28 August 2020, Anne-Marie featured on the Rudimental song "Come Over". On 12 November 2020, Anne-Marie released the single "Problems". On the same day, her documentary, How To Be Anne-Marie, was released on YouTube Originals. The documentary gives light to the fans and a closer look about her personal life and her "time away from the limelight". Her documentary also features fellow celebrities, including Little Mix.

On 2 January 2021, she made her first appearance as the newest coach for the tenth series of The Voice UK, replacing Meghan Trainor. A member of her team, Craig Eddie, won series 10, giving Anne-Marie her first win on her first series as a coach.

On 15 January 2021, Anne-Marie released the single "Don't Play" in collaboration with British YouTuber and rapper-singer KSI and English DJ and producer Digital Farm Animals as the lead single from her second studio album.

Anne-Marie contributed vocals on the song "Way Too Long" in collaboration with Nathan Dawe and MoStack on 9 April 2021. On 13 May 2021, Anne-Marie announced the single "Our Song" with Niall Horan as the third single from her upcoming second studio album. The song was released on 21 May 2021. On 23 July 2021, Anne-Marie released the single "Kiss My (Uh-Oh)" as the fourth single, featuring Little Mix on the same day her album Therapy was released.

In November 2021 it was announced she would dance with Graziano Di Prima in the 2021 Strictly Come Dancing Christmas Special, which she went on to win.

In 2021 Anne-Marie also released the track "Beautiful", which retold the life of the Syrian refugee and parathlete Dima Aktaa.

2022–present: Upcoming third studio album, features in other artists' songs
On 27 May 2022, Anne-Marie collaborated with Swedish DJ duo Neiked and American rapper Latto on the song "I Just Called".

On 26 August 2022, Anne-Marie featured in K-pop boy group Seventeen's new version of their latest song "_World".

On 15 September 2022, Anne-Marie released the single "Psycho", in collaboration with British rapper Aitch, as the lead single from her third studio album.

In an interview with FM104 regarding her third studio album, Anne-Marie explained that "I've been writing a lot of new stuff... and I feel like I've figured out what I want to say. I feel like from the first and second album I've learnt a lot about myself, and know this is now who I am."

On 3 February 2023, Anne-Marie released SAD B!TCH - the second single from her upcoming third studio album.

Personal life
In 2018, Anne-Marie revealed that she is attracted to both men and women, but that she does not identify with the label bisexual. She said, "I just feel like I'm attracted to who I like."

Anne-Marie has opened up about her struggle with anxiety. She said that therapy helped her "face her demons during lockdown". She also stated that she has ADHD, dyslexia and OCD.

In February 2023, Anne-Marie's relationship with British rapper Slowthai was confirmed in his interview with Rolling Stone.

Discography

Studio albums
 Speak Your Mind (2018)
 Therapy (2021)
 TBA (2023)

Filmography

Tours
Headlining
 Speak Your Mind World Tour (2018–19)
 Dysfunctional Tour (2022)

Supporting
 ÷ Tour (Europe and North America legs) (2017–18)

Awards and nominations

References

External links

 

1991 births
Living people
21st-century English women singers
Asylum Records artists
Atlantic Records artists
Grime music artists
British hip hop singers
British women hip hop musicians
English women songwriters
English female karateka
LGBT karateka
English LGBT singers
English LGBT songwriters
English LGBT sportspeople
Musicians from Essex
People from East Tilbury
Shotokan practitioners
Warner Records artists
21st-century English LGBT people